Brachylomia thula is a moth of the family Noctuidae. It is found from British Columbia to southern Oregon in and west of the Cascade Range.

External links
Bug Guide
Images

Brachylomia
Moths of North America
Moths described in 1898